The Old Cathedral of St. Sophia  also called Catholic Cathedral of St. Sophia is the name given to a Catholic cathedral that was in the city of Kyiv, the capital of the European country of Ukraine. It was transformed into an Orthodox church and later demolished during the Soviet era. The current main Catholic cathedral is now dedicated to St. Nicholas.

It is the oldest and historical Latin cathedral in Kyiv, the seat of the Bishop of the Catholic Church in the Diocese of Kyiv which was part of the metropolis of Lviv since 1412.

It began as a wooden chapel burned down in the year 1017. 

A brick church was built only between 1614 and 1633 on efforts of Krzysztof Kazimirski within a Dominican monastery. With start of the Khmelnytskyi Uprising, the local Dominican Order was liquidated and the cathedral was robbed. Since 1650s it was used by the Muscovite voivode as a guard house.

In 1691 Metropolitan Varlaam of Kyiv consecrated as the Eastern Orthodox temple, the Church of Saints Peter and Paul. At first it did not have own staff and was assigned to the Saint Sophia's Cathedral. It was rebuilt in 1724 and in 1784 it was transformed into a separate temple. In 1744-50 the church was restructured and Ivan Grigorovich-Barsky built a three-story belltower next to the church. The Sts Peter and Paul Church was damaged during the 1811 Great Podil fire and top level of belltower was taken apart.

In 1832 at the court of the church compound was built the Kyiv-Podil Theological School.

In 1920 the church was closed to worship and its building was planned to be used as a warehouse for the Central Archives of Ukraine. However, around 1935 the church together with its belltower was destroyed.

See also
Roman Catholicism in Ukraine
Saint Sophia's Cathedral, Kyiv

References

External links
 Oleksandr Tolpyhin. Podil church of Saints Peter and Paul (Петропавлівська церква на Подолі). Svoboda. 8 September 2017

Roman Catholic cathedrals in Ukraine
Cathedrals in Kyiv
Demolished buildings and structures in Kyiv
Demolished churches  in Ukraine
Religious buildings and structures completed in 1724
Baroque architecture in Kyiv
Baroque church buildings in Ukraine
Dominican churches
Podilskyi District
Buildings and structures demolished in 1935